The Spanish Constitution of 1856 was also known as the "unborn (no nata)", a Republican attempt at reform because although it was passed by parliament, it was never implemented due to the "counterrevolutionary coup" of General Leopoldo O'Donnell that ended the progressive regime.

As a consequence of enacting an illegal constitution Isabella II of Spain decreed the closure of the constituent assembly elected in 1854. The document was therefore officially declared merely a failed draft project although technically it was a valid constitution.

It is important as it collected together the ideas of progressive liberal ideology and anticipated some of the ideas developed later by the Spanish Constitution of 1869 which ended the autocratic regime of Isabella and put the more democratic Amadeo I of Spain on the throne.
Constitutions of Spain